Veaceslav Platon (born 24 January 1973) is a Moldovan businessman and former member of the Parliament of Moldova from 2009 to 2010. He also holds Russian citizenship.

Platon is one of the wealthiest people in Moldova, with businesses in the field of sugar and banking in Moldova, and atomic energy in Ukraine. In 1994, Platon became vice-president of the administrative board of the Moldovan private bank Moldindconbank, and later became vice-president of the board of another Moldovan bank, Investprivatbank. In 1998, he was elected as a member of the Municipal Council of Chișinău on the lists of the electoral bloc of agrarians.

He was accused of economic crimes, and nicknamed "raider No. 1 in the CIS".

Platon is the alleged architect of the Russian Laundromat, a scheme to move $20–80 billion out of Russia from 2010 to 2014 through a network of global banks, many of them in Moldova and Latvia.

On 20 April 2017, Platon was sentenced to 18 years in prison. However, then he was released, re-tried, and on 14 June 2021 was acquitted. On 19 July 2021 he flew from Chișinău to London, and from there he flew to Prague.

Personal life and views 
Veaceslav Platon is married to Evgenia Tulchevskaya, a Ukrainian woman who at the age of 20 won the Miss Ukraine title in 2009.

Platon is a native speaker of Russian. In a 2016 interview, he stated that the only way for Moldova to escape from the "disastrous situation in which it is" would be the unification with România.

References

External links 
 Profil pe site-ul parlamentului
Relațiile lui Platon cu Moldindconbank :Rise Moldova

1973 births
Living people
Moldovan businesspeople
Moldovan lawyers
Our Moldova Alliance politicians
Moldovan MPs 2009–2010